John Maughan (25 July 1904 – after 1929) was an English footballer who made 124 appearances in the Football League playing as a goalkeeper for Darlington, Doncaster Rovers and Bury in the 1920s.

References

1904 births
Year of death missing
Footballers from Newcastle upon Tyne
English footballers
Association football goalkeepers
Darlington F.C. players
Doncaster Rovers F.C. players
Bury F.C. players
English Football League players
Place of death missing